Brookeland is an unincorporated community in southwestern Sabine and northwestern Jasper counties in the Deep East region of the U.S. state of Texas. It is located thirteen miles south of Bronson on U.S. Highway 96. It has a population of approximately 300. The ZIP Code for Brookeland is 75931

The Brookeland Independent School District serves area students.  West Sabine ISD serves some students in the area as well.

References

External links

Unincorporated communities in Sabine County, Texas
Unincorporated communities in Jasper County, Texas
Unincorporated communities in Texas